

ANF Les Mureaux (full name: Les Ateliers de Construction du Nord de la France et des Mureaux) was a French aircraft manufacturer founded in Les Mureaux in 1918 as Les Ateliers des Mureaux building aircraft under license. Significant products included Vickers Vimys and Breguet 14s during the 1920s. Under head designer André Brunet, it also produced a few original parasol-winged monoplanes that eventually led to the firm's greatest success, the 113 military reconnaissance aircraft of 1931 and its derivatives.

In 1928, it purchased French seaplane manufacturer Besson and in 1930 amalgamated with Ateliers de Construction du Nord de la France, a railway firm. In 1937, it was nationalized and made part of SNCAN.

Aircraft built by Les Mureaux and ANF Les Mureaux.

References

 
 Golden Years of Aviation

Defunct aircraft manufacturers of France
Vehicle manufacturing companies established in 1918
Manufacturing companies disestablished in 1937
French companies established in 1918
1937 disestablishments in France
1930 mergers and acquisitions